Arnhemia is a town in Deli Serdang Regency, North Sumatra, Indonesia.

External links
map

Populated places in North Sumatra